Edward Abambire Bawa (born Saturday 1 September 1973) is a Ghanaian politician who was a member of the Seventh Parliament of the Fourth Republic of Ghana and currently a member of the Eighth Parliament of the Fourth Republic of Ghana representing the Bongo Constituency in the Upper East Region of Ghana on the ticket of the National Democratic Congress.

Early Life and education 
Edward Abambire Bawa was born and hails from Bongo-Lungu in the Upper East Region of Ghana. Edward Abambire Bawa passed his Common Entrance Examination in 1986 which enabled him obtain his Ordinary Level(O – Level) in 1991 and Advanced Level(A – Level) in 1993. Edward Abambire Bawa proceeded to have his Bachelor of Education in Chemistry from the University of Cape Coast, Ghana in the year 2002, Master of Business Administration in Business Finance from the University of Liverpool in the year 2007, Certificate in Development Communications in the year 2012, Certificate in Risk Communications in the year 2014. He again had a Postgraduate certificate from Harvard School of Public Health, a Postgraduate certificate from the University of Southern California and a Postgraduate certificate from the Setym International.

Career 
Edward Abambire Bawa is the Head of Communication for World Bank Project (Oil and Gas Capacity building Project) of the Ministry of Petroleum in Accra, Ghana. Edward Abambire Bawa is now working as the Member of parliament (MP) for Bongo Constituency in the Upper East Region of Ghana on the ticket of the National Democratic Congress.

Political life 
Edward Abambire Bawa contested and won the 2016 NDC parliamentary primaries for Bongo Constituency in the Upper East Region of Ghana. Edward Abambire Bawa proceeded to win the parliamentary seat in his constituency (Bongo Constituency) in the Upper East Region of Ghana during the 2016 Ghanaian general elections on the ticket of the National Democratic Congress to join the Seventh (7th) Parliament of the Fourth Republic of Ghana with 18,442 votes (47.9%) against Gabriel Nsoh Ade Agana of the New Patriotic Party who had 6,800 votes (17.7%), Afari George A-Engbinge of the Progressive People's Party(PPP) who also had 12,932 votes (33.6%) and Awillum Ebenezer Awine of the Convention People's Party(CPP) who had 295 votes (0.8%).

Edward Abambire Bawa again contested and won the 2020 NDC parliamentary primaries for Bongo Constituency in the Upper East Region of Ghana with 590 votes against Dr. Rainer Akumperigya who had 291 votes. Edward Abambire Bawa again proceeded to win in the 2020 Ghanaian general elections on the ticket of the National Democratic Congress to join the Eighth (8th) Parliament of the Fourth Republic of Ghana with 26,268 votes (57.7%) against Ayinbisa Ayamga Peter of the New Patriotic Party who had 17,276 votes (37.9%), Afari George A-Engbinge of the Progressive People's Party(PPP) who had 1,548 votes (3.4%) and Akamah Richard of the Ghana Union Movement(GUM) who had 439 votes (1.0%).

Committees 
Edward Abambire Bawa is a member of the Poverty Reduction strategy Committee. He is also a member of the Mines and Energy Committee of the Eighth (8th) Parliament of the Fourth Republic of Ghana.

Personal Life 
Edward Abambire Bawa is a Christian.

Philanthropy 
Edward Abambire Bawa donated alcohol (a local gin "Kalahari bitters" and "Akpeteshie" ) to fight coronavirus(COVID-19) in his constituency (Bongo Constituency) in the Upper East Region of Ghana. Edward Abambire Bawa took the fight against Coronavirus in the country to a different level.

References

Ghanaian MPs 2017–2021
1973 births
Living people
Ghanaian MPs 2021–2025